Charlotte Hegele  is a Canadian actress best known for her role as Kate Andrews on the Canadian television drama series Bomb Girls.

Life and career 
Charlotte Hegele is an Ontarian who was born in Toronto and spent most of her childhood in London, Ontario. Hegele began acting in community theatre and decided to return to Toronto in 2008 to attend Humber College's Acting for Film and Television Diploma Program. After graduation, she began working on several projects filmed in Toronto, such as Murdoch Mysteries and a recurring role on the television show Guidance, before acquiring her lead role on the World War II period drama Bomb Girls, and its subsequent film Bomb Girls: Facing the Enemy.

Since 2014, Hegele has had a recurring role as Julie Thatcher on the American-Canadian television drama series When Calls the Heart.

Filmography

References

External links
 

1990 births
Living people
21st-century Canadian actresses
Actresses from Toronto
Canadian film actresses
Canadian television actresses